was a town located in Usa District, Ōita Prefecture, Japan.

As of 2003, the town had an estimated population of 4,860 and the density of 42.77 persons per km2. The total area was 113.62 km2.

On March 31, 2005, Innai, along with the town of Ajimu (also from Usa District), was merged into the expanded city of Usa.

Dissolved municipalities of Ōita Prefecture